Kang Sun-young (born 1966) is a South Korean military officer - the first woman to become a two-star major general of South Korean military and to head the Aviation Operations Command of its Army respectively.

Before promoted to major general in November 2019, she was the president of Army Aviation School.

She started her military service in 1990 when she was commissioned as Army's second lieutenant. In 1993 she was admitted to Army Aviation School where she graduated from as the top of her helicopter class. She was the first woman to become Army special operation forces' jumpmaster and captain respectively. She continued to serve in aviation-related area as the commander of the 60th Aviation Group, 11th Aviation Group and chief of staff at the Army Operations Command.

References 

Living people
People from Yeosu
South Korean military personnel
1966 births
South Korean aviators